Mnikelo Ndabankulu lives in Durban, South Africa. He was the spokesperson for Abahlali baseMjondolo up until May 2014 and appears in the film Dear Mandela.

Early life 
He was born in the town of Flagstaff on the Wild Coast and now lives in the Foreman Road shack settlement in Durban, which has 7000 inhabitants. In 2013 the Mail & Guardian 200 Young South Africans.

Activism
Ndabankulu was a founding member of Abahlali baseMjondolo. He was critical of the impact of the FIFA 2010 World Cup on shack dwellers in Durban.

Dear Mandela
Ndabankulu features prominently in the award winning documentary feature film Dear Mandela which tells the story of three young activists in Abahlali baseMjondolo.<ref>In 'Dear Mandela', South African Slum Dwellers Fight Back, by Cynthia Fuchs, Pop Matters', 13 August 2012</ref>

International Human Rights Award
In March 2012 Amnesty International recognized his work with the 'Golden Butterfly' Human Rights Prize in a ceremony at the Hague in the Netherlands.

References

External links
 Reclaiming our dignity and voices, by Sokari Ekine, Pambazuka, 2009
We Want the Full Loaf (not just a child support grant), by Mnikelo Ndabankulu, 2009
Mzansi Voters: Mnikelo Ndabankulu, by Niren Tolsi, Mail & Guardian'', 2009
Interview with Mnikelo Ndabankulu in The Guardian (UK), 2009
Mnikelo Ndabankulu is awarded the GOLDEN BUTTERFLY prize, March 2012 (Video)

Living people
South African activists
Shack dwellers
Year of birth missing (living people)
20th-century squatters
Housing in South Africa
21st-century squatters